Sabina Park is a 20,000 capacity cricket ground in Kingston, Jamaica, it is one of the home grounds of the West Indies cricket team. The ground hosted its first Test match in 1930 when the West Indies played England in a timeless Test, One Day Internationals (ODIs) have been played at the ground since 1984 and Twenty20 Internationals (T20Is) have been played at the ground since 2014. The ground has been the scene of 94 Test and 23 ODI and 1 T20I centuries.

Three centuries were scored in the ground's inaugural Test match, the first was by the Englishman Andy Sandham, at the time his innings of 325 was a world record. The first West Indian to score a Test century at the ground was George Headley, who made 223 in the same match. He followed this with a score of 270 not out in 1935 and remains the only batsman to have scored two double centuries at the ground. In 1958 the ground saw another world record Test score when Garfield Sobers made 365 not out against Pakistan, a record that stood until 1994. Sobers is one of two players to have scored five Test centuries at the ground, the other is Clyde Walcott.

Desmond Haynes became the first ODI centurion at the ground when he made 104 not out against Australia in 1984. Graeme Smith scored the first ODI century at the ground by an overseas player in 2005. Four centuries were scored at the ground during the 2007 Cricket World Cup, including 160 which was made by the Pakistani Imran Nazir. Upul Tharanga holds the record for the highest ODI score at the ground, 174 not out, which he scored for Sri Lanka against India. The highest score by a West Indian at the ground is Chris Gayle's 125 which was made in 2012. Gayle is the only player to have scored three ODI centuries at the ground.

As of 10 July 2017, only one T20I century has been scored at Sabina Park when Evin Lewis hit 125* against India and thus holds the highest T20I score at the ground.

Key
 * denotes that the batsman was not out.
 Inns. denotes the number of the innings in the match.
 Balls denotes the number of balls faced in an innings.
 NR denotes that the number of balls was not recorded.
 Parentheses next to the player's score denotes his century number at Sabina Park.
 The column title Date refers to the date the match started.
 The column title Result refers to whether the player's team won, lost or if the match was drawn or tied.

Test centuries

The following table summarises the Test centuries scored at Sabina Park.

One Day International centuries
The following table summarises the One Day International centuries scored at Sabina Park.

Twenty20 International centuries
The following table summarises the Twenty20 International centuries scored at Sabina Park.

References 

Sabina Park
Cricket grounds in Jamaica
Centuries